Reisch is a surname, and may refer to:

Agnes Reisch, German ski jumper
Cheri Toalson Reisch, American politician 
Gregor Reisch (c.1467–1525), Carthusian humanist writer
Günter Reisch, German film director
Lucia A. Reisch, behavioural economist and social scientist
Max Reisch (1912–1985), Austrian long-distance motorcyclist and author
Michael Reisch (born 1964), German artist and photographer
Stefan Reisch (born 1941), German footballer 
Walter Reisch, Austrian director and screenwriter

See also
Reisch Beer